Corey Michael Dennis (born July 25, 1992) is an American football coach who is currently the quarterbacks coach at Ohio State University.

Playing career 
Dennis played at Georgia Tech from 2011 to 2014, where he was a reserve defensive back before transitioning to wide receiver. Although he only caught one pass in his career in Tech's triple option offense, his biggest contribution was his play on special teams. At the conclusion of his playing career, Dennis had tied a program record by playing in all 54 games of his four-year career.

Coaching career

Ohio State 
After his playing career ended, Dennis got a job at Ohio State in 2015 as an intern, where his father-in-law Urban Meyer was coaching. He has acknowledged that his connection to Meyer may have played a significant part in the beginning of his career at Ohio State, but his work ethic was praised by Meyer's successor Ryan Day and former players such as Heisman Trophy winner Joe Burrow. He was promoted to a graduate assistant position in 2016, and then promoted again in 2018 as the senior quality control coach. In his role as the senior quality control coach, Dennis received praise from Ohio State quarterbacks and Heisman Trophy finalists Dwayne Haskins and Justin Fields for his assistance in their stellar 2018 and 2019 seasons.

Dennis was promoted to quarterbacks coach in 2020, replacing Mike Yurcich.

Personal life 
Born in Auburn, Alabama and raised in Troy, Dennis' father Steve played college football at Georgia and was also the athletic director at Troy from 2005 to 2012. He is married to Nicki Meyer, the daughter of former Ohio State head coach Urban Meyer who he met when they were both athletes at Georgia Tech. They have two sons, Troy and Gray.

References

External links 
 Ohio State Buckeyes bio

1992 births
Living people
Sportspeople from Auburn, Alabama
People from Troy, Alabama
Players of American football from Alabama
Coaches of American football from Alabama
American football wide receivers
American football quarterbacks
Georgia Tech Yellow Jackets football players
American football defensive backs
Ohio State Buckeyes football coaches